Guy Hellers (born 10 October 1964) is a Luxembourgish football manager and former player, who played as a midfielder.

He was the head coach of the Luxembourg national team, having succeeded Dane Allan Simonsen in 2004.

In 2010, Hellers resigned as Luxembourg coach and was succeeded by Luc Holtz.

Club career
Arguably Luxembourg's most successful player, Hellers shortly played for FC Metz but he spent the majority of his career at Standard Liège, where has been captain. He played 458 matches in total for them, scoring 37 goals. He was surprisingly dismissed by then manager Tomislav Ivic in September 1999 after some verbal clashes between coach and squad.

International career
Hellers made his debut for Luxembourg in an October 1982 European Championship qualification match against Greece and went on to earn 55 caps, scoring 2 goals. He played in 27 FIFA World Cup qualification matches. His final international game was an October 1997 World Cup qualification match against Cyprus.

He scored the only goal in the upset match against the Czech Republic in 1995.

International goals
Scores and results list Luxembourg's goal tally first.

Manager career
His entire coaching career has been spent with the Luxembourg Football Federation, coaching at every youth level before becoming the manager of the senior national team.

Honours
Standard Liège
 Belgian Cup: 1992–93

References

External links
 
 Paolo Amodio at Footballdatabase

1964 births
Living people
FC Metz players
Standard Liège players
Belgian Pro League players
Expatriate footballers in Belgium
Luxembourgian footballers
Luxembourgian expatriate footballers
Luxembourg international footballers
Luxembourgian football managers
Luxembourg national football team managers
F91 Dudelange managers
Luxembourgian expatriate sportspeople in France
Luxembourgian expatriate sportspeople in Belgium
Association football midfielders